Yuxarı Noxudlu (also, Yukhary Nokhudlu and Verkhniye Nokhudly) is a village and municipality in the Salyan Rayon of Azerbaijan. It has a population of 914.

References 

Populated places in Salyan District (Azerbaijan)